The 2007 Ontario general election was held on October 10, 2007, to elect members (MPPs) of the 39th Legislative Assembly of the Province of Ontario, Canada. The Liberals under Premier Dalton McGuinty won the election with a majority government, winning 71 out of a possible 107 seats with 42.2% of the popular vote. The election saw the third-lowest voter turnout in Ontario provincial elections, setting a then record for the lowest voter turnout with 52.8% of people who were eligible voted. This broke the previous record of 54.7% in the 1923 election, but would end up being surpassed in the 2011 and 2022 elections.

As a result of legislation passed by the Legislature in 2004, election dates are now fixed by formula so that an election is held approximately four years after the previous election, unless the government is defeated by a vote of "no confidence" in the Legislature. Previously, the governing party had considerable flexibility to determine the date of an election anywhere up to five years of being elected. The date of this election was originally presumed to be October 4, 2007; however, the law fixes the date on the first Thursday of October or on any day within seven days thereof if required to accommodate a date of "religious or cultural significance".  The date was set as October 10, 2007, to avoid a conflict with the Jewish holiday of Shemini Atzeret, which fell on October 4, 2007.

In the same election, there was a provincial referendum on whether to change from first-past-the-post to mixed member proportional representation, as recommended by the Ontario Citizens' Assembly on Electoral Reform. This measure failed, with 37% of the participating electorate and 5 out of 107 ridings voting for the new system; a 60% supermajority was required province-wide, with at least 2/3 of the ridings also supporting it by a simple majority.

Issues
Although all four parties released a variety of detailed platform proposals, the campaign was dominated almost entirely by John Tory's promise to extend public funding to Ontario's faith-based schools.

In Ontario at present, the Catholic school system is fully funded in the same manner as public schools. However, other religious schools, such as Jewish, Muslim or Evangelical Christian schools, are not funded by the province. This discrepancy has been cited as discriminatory by both the Supreme Court of Canada and the United Nations Human Rights Committee, although to date the province has taken no action to change its existing school funding policies, on the grounds that Catholic school funding in the province is mandated by the Constitution of Canada.

Tory's proposal to extend funding to religious schools was controversial, with polls confirming that a clear majority of Ontarians opposed the proposal.  Even some of Tory's own caucus, most notably Bill Murdoch and Garfield Dunlop, openly criticized the proposal during the election campaign. After heavy opposition, Tory changed his position later in the campaign, promising a free vote on the issue.

The Liberals and the NDP were both opposed to non-Catholic religious school funding, while the Green Party proposed eliminating the province's existing Catholic school funding in favour of a single public school board. Liberal opposition to non-Catholic religious school funding, especially private Muslim schools, appealed to Islamophobic sentiment in the province.

There was a brief flurry of interest in health care issues when John Tory emphasized his support for an increasing role for the private sector in health care.

In the final week of the campaign, NDP leader Howard Hampton criticized the media for focusing almost entirely on religious schools and virtually ignoring other issues.

Ridings

With the passing of Bill 214 and the Representation Act, 2005 in 2005, Ontario's electoral boundaries are no longer identical to the federal electoral boundaries. The province is now divided into 11 northern electoral districts that are identical, except for a minor boundary adjustment, to the ones that existed on October 2, 2003, and 96 southern electoral districts that are identical to their federal counterparts as they existed on September 1, 2004.

The 11 northern electoral districts are: Algoma—Manitoulin, Kenora—Rainy River, Nickel Belt, Nipissing, Parry Sound—Muskoka, Sault Ste. Marie, Sudbury, Thunder Bay—Atikokan, Thunder Bay—Superior North, Timiskaming—Cochrane, and Timmins—James Bay.

As a result of the redistribution, none of the three major parties took fewer seats than it held at the dissolution of the previous legislature. The Liberals and the Progressive Conservatives each gained seats, while the New Democratic Party's seat total remained unchanged.

Results by party

|- style="background-color:#CCCCCC"
!rowspan="2" colspan="2" style="text-align:left;" |Party
!rowspan="2" style="text-align:left;" |Party leader
!rowspan="2"|Candidates
!colspan="4" style="text-align:center;" |Seats
!colspan="3" style="text-align:center;" |Popular vote
|- style="background-color:#CCCCCC"
| style="text-align:center;" |2003
| style="text-align:center;font-size:80%;" |Dissol.
| style="text-align:center;" |2007
| style="text-align:center;" |Change
| style="text-align:center;" |#
| style="text-align:center;" |%
| style="text-align:center;" |Change

| style="text-align:left;" |Dalton McGuinty
| style="text-align:right;" |107
| style="text-align:right;" |72
| style="text-align:right;" |67
| style="text-align:right;" |71
| style="text-align:right;" |+6.0%
| style="text-align:right;" |1,869,273
| style="text-align:right;" |42.25%
| style="text-align:right;" |-4.22%

| style="text-align:left;" |John Tory
| style="text-align:right;" |107
| style="text-align:right;" |24
| style="text-align:right;" |25
| style="text-align:right;" |26
| style="text-align:right;" |+4.0%
| style="text-align:right;" |1,398,806
| style="text-align:right;" |31.62%
| style="text-align:right;" |-3.05%

| style="text-align:left;" |Howard Hampton
| style="text-align:right;" |107
| style="text-align:right;" |7
| style="text-align:right;" |10
| style="text-align:right;" |10
| style="text-align:right;" |-
| style="text-align:right;" |741,465
| style="text-align:right;" |16.77%
| style="text-align:right;" |+2.08%

| style="text-align:left;" |Frank de Jong
| style="text-align:right;" |107
| style="text-align:right;" |-
| style="text-align:right;" |-
| style="text-align:right;" |-
| style="text-align:right;" |-
| style="text-align:right;" |354,897
| style="text-align:right;" |8.02%
| style="text-align:right;" |+5.20%

| style="text-align:left;" |Giuseppe Gori
| style="text-align:right;" |83
| style="text-align:right;" |-
| style="text-align:right;" |-
| style="text-align:right;" |-
| style="text-align:right;" |-
| style="text-align:right;" |35,702
| style="text-align:right;" |0.81%
| style="text-align:right;" |+0.01%

| style="text-align:left;" |Sam Apelbaum
| style="text-align:right;" |25
| style="text-align:right;" |-
| style="text-align:right;" |-
| style="text-align:right;" |-
| style="text-align:right;" |-
| style="text-align:right;" |9,249
| style="text-align:right;" |0.21%
| style="text-align:right;" |+0.17%

| style="text-align:left;" |Paul McKeever
| style="text-align:right;" |15
| style="text-align:right;" |-
| style="text-align:right;" |-
| style="text-align:right;" |-
| style="text-align:right;" |-
| style="text-align:right;" |3,003
| style="text-align:right;" |0.07%
| style="text-align:right;" |-0.13%

| style="text-align:left;" |Elizabeth Rowley
| style="text-align:right;" |8
| style="text-align:right;" |-
| style="text-align:right;" |-
| style="text-align:right;" |-
| style="text-align:right;" |-
| style="text-align:right;" |1,603
| style="text-align:right;" |0.04%
| style="text-align:right;" |-0.01%

| style="text-align:left;" |Danish Ahmed
| style="text-align:right;" |2
| style="text-align:right;" |-
| style="text-align:right;" |-
| style="text-align:right;" |-
| style="text-align:right;" |-
| style="text-align:right;" |502
| style="text-align:right;" |0.01%
| style="text-align:right;" |-

| style="text-align:left;" |Eileen Butson
| style="text-align:right;" |2
| style="text-align:right;" |-
| style="text-align:right;" |-
| style="text-align:right;" |-
| style="text-align:right;" |-
| style="text-align:right;" |446
| style="text-align:right;" |0.01%
| style="text-align:right;" |+0.00%

| style="text-align:left;" |Brad Harness
| style="text-align:right;" |2
| style="text-align:right;" |-
| style="text-align:right;" |-
| style="text-align:right;" |-
| style="text-align:right;" |-
| style="text-align:right;" |354
| style="text-align:right;" |0.01%
| style="text-align:right;" |-

| style="text-align:left;" |Trueman Tuck
| style="text-align:right;" |2
| style="text-align:right;" |-
| style="text-align:right;" |-
| style="text-align:right;" |-
| style="text-align:right;" |-
| style="text-align:right;" |272
| style="text-align:right;" |0.01%
| style="text-align:right;" |-

| colspan=2 style="text-align:left;" |Independents and no affiliation
| style="text-align:right;" |32
| style="text-align:right;" |-
| style="text-align:right;" |-
| style="text-align:right;" |-
| style="text-align:right;" |-
| style="text-align:right;" |8,326
| style="text-align:right;" |0.19%
| style="text-align:right;" |-0.11%

| style="text-align:left;" colspan="4" |Vacant
| style="text-align:right;" |1
| style="text-align:center;" colspan="5" | 
|-
| style="text-align:left;" colspan="3" |Total
| style="text-align:right;" |
| style="text-align:right;" |103
| style="text-align:right;" |103
| style="text-align:right;" |107
| style="text-align:right;" |8,380,551
| style="text-align:right;" |4,423,898
| style="text-align:right;" |100%
| style="text-align:right;" |-
|}

Two independent candidates are running for the unregistered Communist League, while two others are perennial candidates of the Communist Party of Canada (Marxist–Leninist).
Eileen Butson, party president, acted as the CoR's spokesperson as the party decided not to have a party leader.

Maps

Results

Incumbent MPPs who did not run for re-election

Opinion polls
Since the 2003 general election, several polls have been conducted to determine the current preference of voters. They showed a  decline in Liberal support following the 2004 Ontario budget. Overall, support for the governing Liberals has declined slightly since the 2003 election, the NDP has gained some ground since the 2003 election, and the PCs' poll numbers have not changed significantly since 2003.  Support for the Green Party has increased significantly, a shift which parallels the increase in support for the party's federal counterpart. During the pre-election period, the Ontario Greens did not appear as an option in some of the polls.

Polls indicate results for decided voters. More information can be found in the footnotes to each poll, including undecided results, if provided by the pollster.  A dash indicates the absence of a prompt for that party.

Riding specific polls

Timeline

 May 13, 2004 - Andrea Horwath of the NDP is elected in a by-election in Hamilton East and collects over 60% of the vote. The riding was previously held by the Liberals.
 May 18, 2004 - The 2004 Ontario budget is announced. Given its tax increase and healthcare cuts, it is unpopular with the public.
 June 1, 2004 - Bill 87, which would establish fixed election dates, is introduced in the Legislative Assembly.
 August 9, 2004 - A poll by Environics shows the Liberals in second place for the first time since the last election. The NDP is also rising in support. According to the poll, the Progressive Conservatives lead with 37% followed by the Liberals with 35%, the NDP with 23% and the Greens with 4%.
 September 18, 2004 - John Tory becomes leader of the Ontario Progressive Conservative Party replacing outgoing former premier Ernie Eves and defeating Jim Flaherty and Frank Klees.
 January 31, 2005 - Eves resigns his seat in the provincial legislature, clearing the way for Tory to run in the resulting by-election.
 March 17, 2005 - Tory is elected in the Dufferin—Peel—Wellington—Grey by-election, holding the seat for the Conservatives.
 March 29, 2005 - Tory is officially installed as the Leader of the Opposition.
 August 18, 2005 - Speaker Alvin Curling resigns his Scarborough—Rouge River seat to accept a diplomatic appointment. A by-election must be called within six months.
 October 26, 2005 - A by-election is called for Scarborough—Rouge River for November 24.
 November 24, 2005 - Bas Balkissoon wins in the Scarborough–Rouge River by-election, holding the seat for the Liberals.
 November 29, 2005 - Progressive Conservative MPPs Jim Flaherty, John Baird, and NDP MPP Marilyn Churley resign their seats in the provincial legislature to run for seats in the House of Commons of Canada in the 2006 federal election.
 March 1, 2006 - By-elections are called for the ridings of Toronto—Danforth, Nepean—Carleton, and Whitby—Ajax for March 30.  These seats became vacant when they were resigned on November 29, 2005, so the MPPs could run in the federal election of January 2006.
 March 30, 2006 - the NDP's Peter Tabuns wins the Toronto—Danforth by-election, Progressive Conservative Lisa MacLeod wins in Nepean—Carleton, and Progressive Conservative Christine Elliott wins in Whitby-Ajax. The Liberals' star candidates in all three ridings fell short.
 May 18, 2006 - Former Education Minister Gerard Kennedy resigns his Parkdale—High Park seat to pursue his bid for the federal Liberal leadership.
 September 14, 2006 - Cheri DiNovo of the NDP wins the by-election to replace Liberal Gerard Kennedy in Parkdale-High Park.

 September 18, 2006 - Joe Cordiano, MPP for York South—Weston, resigns from cabinet and legislature to spend more time with family.
 September 25, 2006 - Tony Wong, MPP for Markham, resigns from the legislature to run for York Region council in Markham, Ontario.
 September 28, 2006 - Cam Jackson, MPP for Burlington, resigns from the Legislature to run for mayor of Burlington.
 January 10, 2007 - By-elections called in the ridings of: Burlington; Markham; and York South—Weston to be held on February 8, 2007.
 February 7, 2007 - The provincial government announces election date will be October 10, 2007 to avoid conflict with Shemini Atzeret on October 4.
 February 8, 2007 - In three by-elections, Paul Ferreira of the NDP wins York South–Weston from the Liberals while Michael Chan of the Liberals and Joyce Savoline of the PCs hold Markham and Burlington, respectively.
 March 29, 2007 - MPP Tim Peterson leaves the Liberal caucus and intends to run in this election as a Progressive Conservative.
 April 25, 2007 - Democratic Renewal Minister Marie Bountrogianni introduces Bill 218, a bill to have longer voting hours – 9 a.m. to 9 p.m. – that identification be presented, advanced polls increased to 13 days from 6 days, and amendments regarding the referendum on election formulas for electing MPPS. The proposed legislation will also deal with suggestions for online voting and with complaints that the permanent voters' list is unreliable because it does not keep up with moves and deaths.
 May 18, 2007 - New Democratic Party MPP Shelley Martel announced she will not seek re-election in her Nickel Belt riding. She is leaving politics for family reasons, and to pursue other career opportunities.
 May 18, 2007 - A poll released by Environics showed the governing Liberals in second place for the first time since March 2006. According to the poll, the Progressive Conservatives lead with 39% followed by the Liberals with 33%, the NDP with 26% and the Greens with 2%. The poll was conducted between March 13 to April 3, 2007.
 June 3, 2007 - A poll released by SES Research showed that the Liberals and Progressive Conservatives are in a dead-heat, with 29.8% of voters supporting each party. The NDP had 16% and the Green Party had 9%. 15% were undecided.
 June 4, 2007 Today, Bill 218 is given third reading and royal assent. The bill amends the Elections Act with the following changes: making electors present proper identification; methods of updating the permanent register of electors and creating an electronic system to allow electors to change their personal information online; alternative forms of voting and electronic vote counting can now take place; scrutineers from outside an electoral district, now have the same privileges as a resident scrutineer; Ballots will now show party affiliation and any nickname or familiar name of that the candidate requests; the Chief Electoral Officer is allowed to advertise information regarding the October 2007 Referendum on electoral reform.

 June 5, 2007 - Liberal Premier Dalton McGuinty prorogues the Legislature, stating that the passing of 14 bills during the session meant that the government's agenda had been fulfilled.  The adjournment was three weeks earlier than expected and several private members' bills failed to receive third reading, including a bill to make it mandatory to fill out organ transplant cards. The legislature will not sit again until sometime after the October 10th election.
 July 11, 2007 - Citing health concerns Mary Anne Chambers, the Children and Youth Services Minister and MPP for Scarborough East, will not be seeking re-election in the October 10 Ontario vote. She would have run in the Scarborough—Guildwood electoral district.
 July 26, 2007 - Ontario Minister of Citizenship and Immigration Mike Colle resigned after an auditor general's report severely criticizes how $32 million in year-end grants to ethnic groups was administered.
 September 10, 2007 - Official election call. Writ issued as per omnibus Budget Act, Bill 187, that includes the amendment to the Election Act to set writ issuance date. Premier McGuinty formally asked the Lt. Governor to dissolve the legislature. The campaign will be 29 days long, one day longer than the minimum.

 September 18, 2007- Nomination papers due.  A candidate or their designate must submit their nomination papers and deposit in person at the returning office by 2 p.m.
 September 20, 2007- Televised leadership debate between McGuinty, Tory and Hampton.
 September 22 – October 4, 2007 - Advance polling stations open for early voting from 9:00 a.m. until 9:00 p.m.
 October 10, 2007 - Ontario general election from 9:00 a.m. until 9:00 p.m. EDT or in the most western part of the province 8:00 a.m. to 8:00 p.m. CDT as per Provision 20, Section 40(1) and 40(2) of the Election Act.

Election results
At 9:23 pm EDT, Citytv projected a Liberal majority government. CTV News made the same call at 9:30 pm EDT, followed by CBC News at 9:37 pm EDT, and Canadian Press at 9:52 pm EDT.

Also at 10:30 pm EDT, CBC and CTV reported that Progressive Conservative leader John Tory had called Liberal Leader Dalton McGuinty to concede the election. At 10:39 pm EDT, Tory was declared defeated by Canadian Press in the riding of Don Valley West.

At 10:43 pm EDT, Liberal leader Dalton McGuinty took the stage to give his speech to the public, breaking tradition of the defeated party leaders going first.

Each party lost at least one incumbent MPP — Liberals Mario Racco and Caroline Di Cocco, PCs Joe Tascona, Tim Peterson and John Tory and NDP Paul Ferreira were all defeated. However, each party's losses were offset by gains in other seats. The actual changes in party standings were accounted for entirely by the four new seats resulting from redistribution and the defeat of Peterson. Overall, however, most incumbent MPPs were returned in their ridings.

McGuinty became the first Liberal leader in Ontario to win two successive majorities in the legislature since Mitchell Hepburn in the 1937 election.

Breakdown by region

Northern Ontario

All eleven ridings in Northern Ontario were retained by their incumbent parties. The popular vote, however, shifted dramatically, with several Liberal incumbents holding on only very narrowly against NDP challengers. Most notably, Bill Mauro retained Thunder Bay—Atikokan by a margin of just 36 votes against John Rafferty, whom Mauro had defeated in 2003 by a margin of over 11,000 — Rafferty, in fact, spent much of the night leading Mauro. A judicial recount on October 31 increased Mauro's margin of victory to 50 votes. David Ramsay, similarly, trailed New Democrat John Vanthof in Timiskaming—Cochrane for much of the night, pulling ahead to a winning margin of 634 votes only in the final few polls to report. This was the narrowest margin of victory in Ramsay's 22-year career. Michael Gravelle also retained Thunder Bay—Superior North by an uncharacteristically narrow margin over Jim Foulds.

As well, Monique Smith retained Nipissing by just 377 votes over Progressive Conservative candidate Bill Vrebosch — in 2003, she had defeated Progressive Conservative incumbent Al McDonald by a wider margin of over 3,000 votes.

In keeping with this trend, New Democrat incumbents Howard Hampton and Gilles Bisson widened their margins of victory over Liberal challengers compared to 2003, and France Gélinas maintained the same margin that her predecessor, Shelley Martel, had attained in the previous election.

Notably, the rise in popular support for the New Democrats in Northern Ontario carried over into the 2008 federal election, in which the NDP won nearly every seat in the region for the first time in its history.

Eastern Ontario

In Eastern Ontario, the new riding of Lanark—Frontenac—Lennox and Addington was carried by PC candidate Randy Hillier, while all 13 existing ridings were carried by their incumbent parties. With the exception of Yasir Naqvi, who carried Ottawa Centre by a much smaller margin over the NDP than Richard Patten had attained in 2003, Liberals in Ottawa improved their winning margins, although outside of Ottawa the popular vote trend remained relatively stable.

Central Ontario

The most conservative-friendly area of the province, the PC vote largely held up, with the only Liberal gain being Aileen Carroll winning Barrie, the seat she used to represent federally. This was countered by a PC nominal gain in Newmarket—Aurora. The area also delivered the strongest support in the province for the Green Party, with Shane Jolley finishing a very strong second in Bruce—Grey—Owen Sound with 33.1% of the vote, the best finish ever received by any Green candidate in Canada to that point. The Greens also knocked the NDP into fourth place in a majority of area ridings.

Midwestern Ontario

A politically mixed region, Midwestern Ontario had every incumbent party re-elected, as well as some anomalous results; in an election where the PCs were largely held to rural areas, and the Liberals consolidated an urban/suburban base, Elizabeth Witmer held onto the riding of Kitchener—Waterloo for the PCs, while the Liberals won in rural ridings in which they were the incumbent party, such as Huron—Bruce and Perth—Wellington. Further away from the provincewide result, on an election night which demonstrated Liberal strength province wide, Haldimand—Norfolk—Brant delivered the most crushing defeat for a Liberal candidate in the province, with the victorious PC incumbent Toby Barrett coming out 16,571 votes and 38.6% ahead of the Liberal.

Brampton, Mississauga & Oakville

Although the suburban Western GTA had traditionally been a good area for the PCs, winning many seats in the area as recently as the Harris days, where it formed part of the 905-area backbone of the PC government, the Liberals won every seat in the area handily, with the victorious Liberal candidates averaging at around 50%. Even Mississauga South, which prior to the 2003 election had not voted Liberal provincially since the riding's creation, and had been expected to be a very tight race, proved a surprisingly easy victory for Charles Sousa, who gained the seat back for the Liberals from Tim Peterson, who had crossed the floor. The NDP continued to be a non-factor in the area, while the Greens growth in popular vote across the province was reflected, with the Greens even beating the NDP into fourth place in Oakville, which ironically had been the only riding in the province the Greens had not run in the previous election.

Southern Durham and York

The Liberals continued to dominate York Region, with each incumbent being re-elected by a comfortable margin except in Thornhill where Mario Racco lost to PC candidate Peter Shurman. The newly created riding of Ajax—Pickering, projected to be a close race, elected Liberal Joe Dickson by over 6,000 votes despite having no party nominate incumbents. In southern Durham Region, Liberal Wayne Arthurs was re-elected to the newly distributed Pickering—Scarborough East, while Progressive Conservative Christine Elliott was re-elected to Whitby—Oshawa. Despite high expectations for Sid Ryan's fourth run as an NDP candidate in Oshawa, PC incumbent Jerry Ouellette was again re-elected by a wider majority than in 2003.

Hamilton, Burlington & Niagara

An area with several close seats, and a fairly even distribution of seats, every party had a realistic chance of increasing its seat count here. Hamilton East—Stoney Creek, which was a merger of a Liberal held riding and an NDP held riding, and had neither incumbent running, was the most interesting match of the night, with the NDP winning a close race. It proved to be the only change of the election, and every other riding returned the incumbent party, although many in close races, such as Hamilton Mountain (Liberals over NDP), Halton, (PCs over Liberals) and Burlington (PCs over Liberals).

Southwestern Ontario

In an area with a strong rural-urban divide, both the NDP and PCs had strong hopes of making gains against the Liberals. The NDP had strong hopes of upsetting high-profile Liberals in both Windsor West, and Windsor—Tecumseh, given the NDP's ownership of those seats federally, and the continued decline of the local industrial economy. London—Fanshawe was similarly also a top target, as the NDP has the riding federally and finished a close second in 2003. Overall, however, the only area seat that changed hands was Sarnia—Lambton, with Culture Minister Caroline Di Cocco, the most high-profile Liberal casualty of the night, losing to PC challenger Bob Bailey.

Toronto

All ridings in Toronto were retained by their incumbent parties, with the exception of York South—Weston. New Democrat Paul Ferreira, who had won the seat from the Liberals in a by-election in February 2007, was narrowly defeated by a swing back to Liberal candidate Laura Albanese. Almost twice as many people voted in the riding in the general election compared to the by-election.

In Toronto's other notable race, Liberal incumbent Kathleen Wynne defeated PC leader John Tory in Don Valley West. Tory previously represented Dufferin—Caledon, but had chosen to run in a Toronto riding in the general election.

Toronto's only incumbent from 2003 not to run again was Liberal MPP Mary Anne Chambers. The Liberals successfully retained the seat under new candidate Margarett Best.

See also
Politics of Ontario
List of political parties in Ontario
Premier of Ontario
Leader of the Opposition (Ontario)

References

Notes

Citations

Further reading

External links

Elections Ontario
Ontario's 107 electoral districts

Canadian news/media networks
CBC News Coverage
CNEWS Coverage
The Globe and Mail: Ontario Election 2007 Full Coverage 
TheStar.com - Election
OttawaStart Ontario Election Guide
Google map of poll-by-poll results, Ontario General Election, 2007

Blogs and forecasters

DemocraticSPACE Ontario 2007 Coverage
Electionprediction.com: Ontario Election - 2007
Election Almanac - Ontario Provincial Election
Paulitics 2007 Ontario Election Projections (Antweiler Application & Universal Swing Model)
Pollingreport.ca - Ontario Political Situation
TrendLines 2007 Ontario & Federal Riding Projections (includes table of 10 model predictions and how they fared on Election Day)
Professor Antweiler's Voter Migration Election Forecaster - Ontario 2007 Election

 
2007 elections in Canada
2007
2007 in Ontario
October 2007 events in Canada